Bratindra Nath Mukherjee  (1 January 1932 – 4 April 2013) was an Indian historian, numismatist, epigraphist and iconographist, known for his scholarship in central Asian languages such as Sogdian. He was a Carmichael Professor of Ancient Indian History and Culture at Calcutta University and is reported to have deciphered many ancient scripts. He was the author of 50 books and over 700 articles on ancient history, numismatics and epigraphy. The Government of India awarded him the fourth highest civilian honour of the Padma Shri in 1992.

Early life and education 

B. N. Mukherjee was born on the New Year's Day of 1932. He obtained his master's degree in Ancient Indian History and Culture from Calcutta University, learning under Sarasi Kumar Saraswati, J. N. Banerjee and R. G. Basak and did research under the guidance of Arthur Llewellyn Basham, renowned scholar and historian, to secure a doctoral degree from the School of Oriental and African Studies, London. He continued in UK at Cambridge University to research under Harold Walter Bailey on historical linguistics of West and Central Asia, focusing on Iranian, Saka, Saka–Khotanese and Aramaic studies.

Scholarship 
Mukherjee wrote several books on the epigraphy and iconography of the central Asia, such as the Kushans and Yuezhis. His 1989 book, The Rise and Fall of the Kushanas, India in Early Central Asia (1996) and the last of his works, Kushana Studies, New Perspectives, released in 2004, account his observations on these topics. His exploration of Ancient India led him to numismatic studies and he wrote two books on the subject, namely  Numismatic Art of India and Coins of Bengal. Three of his books, The Kushana Genealogy and Chronology (1967), An Agrippan Source: Studies in  Indo-Parthian History (1969) and Kushana Coins in the Land of Five Rivers (1978), employ the study of coins as a means of reconstructing the political and dynastic histories of Saka-Kushana eras. Known to be a scholar of Aramaic and Greek edicts, he elucidated the edicts of Asoka which assisted in the study of the Maurya empire. He asserted that these edicts were translations and transliterations of Prakrit inscriptions and revealed the political intonations of Ashoka's policy of Dhamma. His findings were published in a book, Studies in the Aramaic Edicts of Asoka (1984).

Mukherjee wrote a 300-page commentary on the treatise, Political History of Ancient India: From the Accession of Parikshit to the Extinction of the Gupta Dynasty, considered to be a classic text on ancient India, written by Hem Chandra Raychaudhuri. His studies helped in the understanding of Brahmi and Kharoshti scripts and their etymologies. His style of writing was heavily leaned on to footnotes and his findings have, at times, attracted criticisms. Besides 50 books, he also published over 700 articles in various national and international journals.

Honours 
Mukherjee was a professor at Calcutta University and held the Carmichael chair of the Ancient Indian History and Culture from 1975 to 1998. He was a fellow of the Royal Asiatic Society, UK. The Government of India awarded him the civilian honour of the Padma Shri in 1992. He was the president of the Indian History Congress and was a recipient of the H. C. Raychaudhuri Centenary Medal of the Asiatic Society, Kolkata.

Mukherjee died on 4 April 2013, at the age of 79, survived by his wife and son.

Selected works

References

External links 
 

Recipients of the Padma Shri in other fields
1932 births
2013 deaths
20th-century Indian linguists
Indian numismatists
Indian epigraphers
Historians of Indian art
University of Calcutta alumni
Academic staff of the University of Calcutta
Fellows of the Royal Asiatic Society
Scholars from Kolkata
Bengali historians